Vlečenoto (translated in English as the dragged [oro]) is a traditional Macedonian Oro, a folk dance from the region of Skopje.

Vlečenoto is a female dance with medium-fast movements involving dragging the feet along the ground. Jumps also occur during the dance. The dance begins in a semicircle, and the dance rhythm is 2/4.

See also
Music of North Macedonia

Further reading
Dimovski, Mihailo. (1977:70-2). Macedonian folk dances (Original in Macedonian: Македонски народни ора). Skopje: Naša kniga & Institut za folklor

Macedonian dances